Streptomyces hawaiiensis is a bacterium species from the genus of Streptomyces which has been isolated from soil in Hawaii in the United States. Streptomyces hawaiiensis produces bryamycin and acyldepsipeptides.

Further reading

See also 
 List of Streptomyces species

References

External links
Type strain of Streptomyces hawaiiensis at BacDive -  the Bacterial Diversity Metadatabase

hawaiiensis
Bacteria described in 1956